The Mastercard Japan Championship is a professional golf tournament in Japan on the PGA Tour Champions, played at Narita Golf Club in Narita, Chiba, Japan. The inaugural edition in September 2017 featured an 81-player field competing for a $2.5 million purse, and was a no-cut, 54-hole event.

Colin Montgomerie won the inaugural event by one stroke over Billy Mayfair and Scott McCarron.

Winners

References

External links
Coverage on the PGA Tour Champions' official site

PGA Tour Champions events
Golf tournaments in Japan
2017 establishments in Japan